Anthony Indelicato (born 1955), also known as "Bruno" and "Whack-Whack", is an American Caporegime with the Bonanno crime family of New York City.

Early life
Anthony Indelicato is the son of Alphonse "Sonny Red" Indelicato, a powerful capo in the Bonanno family. Anthony Indelicato's wife is Catherine Burke, a daughter of Lucchese crime family associate Jimmy Burke.

In 1979, Anthony Indelicato participated in the murder of Bonanno boss Carmine Galante.  With the official Bonanno boss Philip Rastelli in prison, Galante had taken effective control of the family in the early 1970s. His ruthlessness and ambition created many enemies within the Bonanno family and in the other New York families.

The Mafia Commission finally allowed several Bonanno capos to plot Galante's assassination. On July 12, 1979, Galante entered Joe and Mary's Italian-American Restaurant in Bushwick, Brooklyn, for lunch. Three gunmen murdered Galante at his table as he was eating lunch on the patio of the restaurant. Two other men who were sitting with him were killed as well. As a reward for his involvement in killing Galante, Indelicato was promoted to capo.

Three capos murder
After Galante's murder, a power struggle erupted between two factions of the Bonanno family. One faction included capos Dominick Napolitano and Joseph Massino, who were loyal to Rastelli. The second faction, which included Indelicato's father Alphonse, Philip Giaccone and Dominick Trinchera, wanted to murder the leaders of the Massino faction and assume power for themselves. After receiving permission from the Mafia Commission, Massino set up a plot to murder the rival captains first.

Napolitano later contacted undercover agent Donnie Brasco, whom he hoped to make a made man, to murder Indelicato, who had previously evaded death after missing a meeting which left his father, Giaccone, and Trinchera dead on May 5, 1981.

After his father's murder, Indelicato went into hiding in Fort Lauderdale, Florida. Massino wanted to kill him also, but he had missed the meeting. His father brought Lino instead, who was the sole survivor of the massacre. Lino, who had escaped, was quickly won over to Massino's side. Napolitano assigned associate Donnie Brasco, whom he hoped to make a made man, to kill Indelicato. "Brasco", however, was in fact an undercover FBI agent named Joseph Pistone; shortly after the hit was ordered, Pistone's assignment was ended and Napolitano was informed of their infiltration.

Mafia Commission Trial and prison
On November 19, 1986, Indelicato was convicted of the 1979 Galante murder during the historic Mafia Commission Trial. On January 13, 1987, he was sentenced to 40 years in prison and fined $50,000. Soon after being sent to prison in Lewisburg, Pennsylvania, Indelicato met Catherine Burke while she was visiting her incarcerated friend John Carneglia. In 1992, Indelicato and Catherine Burke were married at the federal prison in Terre Haute, Indiana. In 1998, Indelicato was released from prison on parole.

Santoro murder
In 2001, Indelicato participated in the murder of Bonanno associate Frank Santoro, who had threatened to kidnap one of the sons of then Bonanno capo, Vincent "Vinny Gorgeous" Basciano. In July 2001, Indelicato was arrested for parole violations after he was videotaped and photographed by investigators associating with men including Basciano. In February 2006, Indelicato was charged with murder and racketeering for the 2001 Santoro murder. In August 2008, Indelicato pleaded guilty to murder, and on December 16, 2008, was sentenced to 20 years in federal prison. Indelicato was imprisoned at the Federal Correctional Institution, Danbury. He was released on May 20, 2022.

In popular culture
 In the 1997 film Donnie Brasco, Anthony Indelicato was portrayed by Brian Tarantina.

References

Further reading
 Jacobs, James B., Christopher Panarella and Jay Worthington. Busting the Mob: The United States Vs. Cosa Nostra. New York: NYU Press, 1994. 
 Raab, Selwyn. Five Families: The Rise, Decline, and Resurgence of America's Most Powerful Mafia Empires. New York: St. Martin Press, 2005. 
 Saggio, Frankie and Fred Rosen. Born to the Mob: The True-Life Story of the Only Man to Work for All Five of New York's Mafia Families. New York: Thunder Mouth Press, 2004. 
 Giovino, Andrea Divorced from the Mob: My Journey from Organized Crime to Independent Woman
 DeStefano, Anthony. The Last Godfather: Joey Massino & the Fall of the Bonanno Crime Family. California: Citadel, 2006.
 Pistone, Joseph, Donnie Brasco: My Undercover Life in the Mafia. Random House Value Publishing (February 1990) 
 Pistone, Joseph D.; & Brandt, Charles (2007). Donnie Brasco: Unfinished Business, Running Press. .

External links
 Anthony Indelicato, Petitioner vs. United States of America, In the Supreme Court of the United States: On Petition for a Writ of Certiorari to the United States Court of Appeals for the Second Circuit
 United States of America, Appellee, vs. Anthony Indelicato, Defendant - Appellant, United States Court of Appeals for the Second Circuit
 Magnuson, Ed (June 24, 2001). "Hitting the Mafia". Time.

American gangsters of Sicilian descent
Bonanno crime family
Living people
American people convicted of murder
Date of birth missing (living people)
1955 births